Doreen Tovey (24 October 1918 – 13 January 2008) was an English writer and cat lover. She was the author of more than a dozen books about the life she and her husband 'Charles' (real name René) shared with their Siamese cats and other animals in Somerset, England. The books have sold more than 150,000 copies in eight countries.

She was president of the Siamese Cat Club, president of the West of England Cat Club  and president of the RSPCA for North Somerset.

Books 

 Cats in the Belfry, 1958
 Cats in May (US title Cats in Cahoots), 1959
 Donkey Work, 1963
 Life with Grandma, 1964
 Raining Cats and Donkeys, 1968
 The New Boy, 1970
 Double Trouble, 1972
 Making the Horse Laugh, 1974
 The Coming of Saska, 1976
 A Comfort of Cats, 1979
 Roses Round the Door, 1982
 Waiting in the Wings, 1986
 More Cats in the Belfry, 1997
 Cats in Concord, 2001

References 

1918 births
2008 deaths
20th-century English writers
People from Somerset
20th-century English women writers
Cat fanciers
21st-century English writers
21st-century English women writers